Jatunjirca (possibly from Quechua hatun big, Ancash Quechua hirka mountain) is a mountain in the eastern part of the Cordillera Blanca in the Andes of Peru which reaches a height of approximately . It is located in the Ancash Region, Huari Province, Huari District, southwest of Huari and west of the village of Yacya.

References

Mountains of Peru
Mountains of Ancash Region